Miguel Ferrer may refer to:

 Miguel Ferrer (1955–2017) Puerto Rican actor
 Miguel Ferrer (footballer) (born 1987) Cuban soccer player
 Miguel Ferrer (bishop) (1591–1659) Spaniard bishop of Tui

Patronomial surname 
 Miguel A. Ferrer Deheza (1915–1989) Argentinian politician
 Miguel Angel Ferrer Martínez (born 1978) Spaniard soccer player

Matronomial surname 
 Miguel Cabanellas Ferrer (1872–1938) Spaniard Spanish army officer during the Spanish Civil War
 Miguel José Serra Ferrer (1713–1784) Spaniard priest, known as the Saint of California

See also
 Ferrer (surname)
 Miguel (disambiguation)
 Ferrer (disambiguation)